Al-Arabi Sporting Club is a Kuwaiti sports club based in Mansuriya, Kuwait City. The most notable section is football team in the Kuwait Premier League.

Al-Arabi SC was named Al-ʿUrūba at the beginning of 1953, and changed to Al-Arabi SC (The Arabian) in 1960.  As winners of the Kuwait Emir Cup in 2008, Al-Arabi SC was the first Kuwaiti team to compete in the AFC Cup. Al-Arabi SC has 63 official trophies next to its name (61 domestic and 2 GCC), the most of any Kuwaiti football team. Al-Arabi SC's stadium is Sabah Al-Salem Stadium in Mansūriya, a suburb of the capital of the country, Kuwait City. It is the second-largest stadium in Kuwait. It had the same points as Kuwait SC in 2014–15 season, but the title went to Kuwait by the principle of the results of the matches between the two teams.

Al-Arabi SC is the only team in Kuwait that has never lost in the Kuwait Super Cup. Holding both records for appearances in the final of the Kuwait Crown Prince Cup 4 consecutive times tied with Kuwait SC and in Kuwait Emir Cup going to the final 11 consecutive times since 1962 to 1973, more than any Kuwaiti team.

History

The beginning
The club was founded as Al-Uruba in mid-1953 as one of the first Kuwaiti teams. Some of the most notable players were Abdulwahab Al-Awadie, Abdulaziz Al-Khatieb, Musad Al-Musad, Mohammed Al-Dawlee, Abdulmajied Mohammed, Mohammed Al-Somale, Dasman Bakhiet, Ahmad Bodha, Monaier Al-Dagag, Fuad Al-Ashgar, Ahmad Hussain, Abbas Al-Shemaly, Mossa Al-Somale, Nayef Dalool and Mohhamed Salah Al-Roomy.

At first in 1960s Al-Arabi SC was structured with divisions of football, basketball, volleyball and weightlifting.

At the beginning Al-Arabi SC made many achievements, thanks to their players and submitted board members. Al-Arabi has many sports with separate facilities. Abdulaziz Al-Khatib multi-purpose hall is used for basketball, handball, volleyball, squash, and can accommodate about 2,000 spectators. The swimming pool has a  capacity of 1,500 spectators. Club also has 4 tennis courts, gymnastics hall, judo, table tennis and boxing sections.

1960–1980 (starting of Il-Za'īm)
Through the years Al-Arabi SC has won the Kuwait Premier League 7 times. They have also won 3 Joint Leagues, 6 Emir Cup's and 1 Federation Cup. They were the first-ever Kuwaiti team to play outside Kuwait, by competing in friendly matches against teams through the Arabian Peninsula, showing competitive play.

On 3 December 1974 Al-Arabi SC faced Lazio from Italy and beat them 1–0 in a friendly match.

1980–2009
In 1982 Al-Arabi SC was the first-ever team to win Gulf Club Champions Cup (GCC Champions League), and then won it again in 2003. 

Al-Arabi SC had changed their logo in 1991. From 1990-2005 they have won 26 titles. Their then-last league title came in 2001–02, with occasional AFC Cup appearances.

2010–2012
Through these 2 seasons they won 2 titles: the Kuwait Super Cup and Kuwait Crown Prince Cup. On 27 December 2011, they were crowned champions of the Crown Prince Cup after 3 trophy-less seasons.

2012–13 UAFA Cup
Al-Arabi had qualified for the final match of UAFA CUP. They were faced against Al-Fateh SC of Saudi Arabia. In the first leg they won 3–2 in Kuwait City, and in the away leg played in Saudi Arabia they tied 2-2, but they qualified to the next round on aggregate (5-4). In the quarter finals, they were matched up against Al-Nassr, again of Saudi Arabia. They lost 3-2 in the first leg played away in Saudi Arabia, however they won 2-0 at home, thus qualifying to the semi-final on aggregate (4-3). In the semi-final, they were matched up against Raja Casablanca. They tied at home 1-1 and in the away leg 2-2. However, they moved on to the final because of the away goals rule.

In the final, they played against USM Alger from Algeria. They tied 0-0 in Kuwait and lost they away leg 3-2, with several controversial refereeing decisions.

2013–14
In the 2013–14 season, Al-Arabi SC qualified for the Kuwait Crown Cup final third time in a row, losing to Al-Qadsia SC (2–1), with more controversial refereeing decisions. 
In the same season Al-Arabi SC finished 5th in the league and got knocked out of the Kuwait Emir Cup by Al-Qadsia penalties, but ended their season winning Kuwait Federation Cup 4–2 over Al-Salmiya SC.

2014–2015
In the 2014–15 season Al-Arabi signed Firas Al-Khatib, showing how strong they want to win Kuwaiti Premier League. They also signed Ivusa from Sahel SC, sent Mahmoud Al-Maowas on loan, and eventually released Ivusa, resigning Maowas and buying Hashem Al-Ramzi. However, Boris Bunjak told Khaled Khalaf he is not needed in Al-Arabi SC. When Al-Arabi SC left for a 2-week pre-season in Turkey, they took Ahmad Hawas, former Al-Salmiya  player. 

They have claimed seasonal seats to be sold the first time, for a fee of $385.

On 16 October 2014 Al-Arabi SC became the first Kuwaiti team to have an anthem. 

After defeating Kuwait SC 4–2 (aet) in the Crown Prince Cup final, it was Al-Arabi's 57th official title.

ِAl-Arabi lost the crucial Kuwait City Derby on 10 April 2015 vs Kuwait SC 1–0. The match had all the seats filled to the last, for the first time in the history of Kuwaiti football. 

Manager Bunjak has requested preparation tour to Italy which was announced, but on 17 July 2015 it was officially stated that he has left the club.

Return to old ways
On 7 December 2015 it was announced that Luiz Felipe has left the club immediately after defeat to Al-Salmiya SC in the Crown Prince Cup. Boris Bunjak returned to manage the team right after.

After the loss of Emir Cup Final to Kuwait SC, the club went into war between fans and head office. After signing with Miodrag Ješić on 13 November 2016, they became the first club in the middle east to have seven managers across two seasons.

By 2021, Al-Arabi managed to win the seventeenth league title in its history, with the help of its Croatian coach Ante Miše after nineteen years, without any loss in 18 games.

Popular culture
One of the first songs was in 2004, "Panorama Al-Arabi", dedicated to the fans and goal celebrations.

Hello Za'eem
As of 2012 the next song was released, "Hello Za'eem". It was used for the 2011–12 Kuwait Crown Prince Cup.

Anthem
On 16 October 2014 Al-Arabi SC became the first Kuwaiti team to have an anthem, first introduced VS Al-Yarmouk.

Crest and colors

Crest evolution

Colors

Al-Arabi SC have changed their colors over the years. Since 1960–90 their colors were light green and white as the away kit.

From 2000–present, they changed to a darker green and the away color was still white.

By 2012 it was announced that Al-Arabi SC will be wearing dark green as their home kit, the away kit will be blue, and the third kit will be white with green.

In the 2013–14 season, Al-Arabi SC wore only the home kit and third kit.

In 2019-present, Al-Arabi SC changed the logo colors from yellow to gold, and for the word 'club' in Arabic they made it white.

Kits

Home

2021-2022

Away

Classicos and derbies

The Kuwaiti Classico

Kuwait City Derby
The Kuwait City derby is match between Al-Arabi SC and Kuwait SC.

Al-Arabi SC vs Al-Salmiya SC

Matches between Al-Salmiya SC and Al-Arabi SC are often high-profile.

As of the 2014–15 season, Al-Salmiya had many new signings to the team and won their first encounter in the league.

Top scorers

Staff

Board of directors

Management

Al Arabi SC managers

Al Arabi statistics

International Competitions (friendly)
1971: Al-Arabi SC 3–0  Perak
3/11/1974: Al-Arabi SC 1–0  Lazio
2/8/2014: Al-Arabi SC 2–0  Bursaspor U-21
5/8/2014: Al-Arabi SC 2–1  Bursa Nilüferspor

Against National Teams
1977–78: Al-Arabi SC 1–1 Poland
2005–06: Al-Arabi SC 2–0 Syria
2007–08: Al-Arabi SC 1–1 Ivory Coast
2013–14: Al-Arabi SC 1–0 Kyrgyzstan

Al Arabi in Asia

Al Arabi in UAFA

Notes: * Round Rubin tournament

Club presidents
The Founding Committee in 1953 through 1960 involved Mohalhel Mohammed Al-Mudhaf and Khalid Ahmed Al-Mudhaf.

Current squad

First-team squad

Players registered as professionals
KPL/VPL clubs are limited to 5 foreign professionals (4 + 1 Asian) per squad while signing 2 non-nationality Kuwaitis where 5 play on the pitch and 6 Kuwaitis play on the pitch.

Former players
 List of Al-Arabi former Players

Retired numbers

Records

Team records

 First Kuwaiti team to win the league 3 times in a row:
1961–62, 1962–63, 1963–64
 First Kuwaiti team to win the league 4 times in a row:
1981–82, 1982–83, 1983–84, 1984–85
 First Kuwaiti team to win the league without a loss or draw:
1961–62
 First Kuwaiti team to win the league without a loss:
1962–63
 longest unbeaten run in the league:
33 matches straight
 Record league victory:
 10–0 v Al-Fahaheel 9/10 1964
 Record biggest league loss:
 1–5 v Kuwait SC 3/2  2011

Individual records
 Most goals:
1. Abdulrahman Al-Dawla – ?
2. Firas Al-Khatib – 186
3. Khaled Khalaf – 66
4. Ahmad Hayel – 55
5. Fahad Al-Rashidi – 51

Most appearances:
Abdulrahman Al-Dawla

Affiliated clubs
  Celtic

Celtic officially announced their affiliation with Al-Arabi SC in order to help both teams assist one another through ideas, experience and scouting. The agreement encompasses all sports mutually practiced by both clubs, but is mainly focused on cooperation in football.
  Celtic Academy

FIFA World Cup and AFC Asian Cup players
FIFA World Cup 1982 
 
 Abdulaziz Al-Buloushi
 Abdullah Al-Buloushi
 Sami Al-Hashash
 Mohammed Karam

Honours
62 Official Trophies As of 6 February 2023

Domestic
 STC Premier League: 17
 1961–62*, 1962–63, 1963–64, 1965–66, 1966–67, 1969–70, 1979–80, 1981–82, 1982–83, 1983–84, 1984–85, 1987–88, 1988–89, 1992–93, 1996–97, 2001–02, 2020–21
(* First ever winners)
 (runner-up): 12
 1967–68, 1968–69, 1970–71, 1972–73, 1973–74, 1978–79, 1980–81, 1986–87, 1989–90, 2002–03, 2003–04, 2014–15
 Kuwaiti Division One: 1
 1999–00
 Kuwait Emir Cup: 16
 1961–62*, 1962–63, 1963–64, 1965–66, 1968–69, 1970–71, 1980–81, 1982–83, 1991–92, 1995–96, 1998–99, 1999–00, 2004–05, 2005–06, 2007–08, 2019–20
(* First ever winners)
 (runner-up): 13
 1964–65, 1966–67, 1967–68, 1969–70, 1971–72, 1973–74, 1989–90, 1990–91, 1994–95, 1997–98, 2008–09, 2015–16, 2017–18
 Kuwait Crown Prince Cup: 9
 1995–96, 1996–97, 1998–99, 1999–00, 2006–07, 2011–12, 2014–15, 2021–22, 2022–23
 (runner-up): 5
 2002–03, 2009–10, 2012–13, 2013–14, 2019–20
 Kuwait Super Cup: 3
 2008*, 2012, 2021
 (runner-up): 1
 2020
(* First ever winners)
 Kuwait Joint League: 5 (record) (defunct)
 1969–70, 1970–71, 1971–72, 1984–85, 1988–89
 Kuwait Federation cup: 8 (record)
 1969–70, 1978-1979, 1995–96, 1996–97, 1998–99, 1999–00, 2000-2001, 2013–14
 (runner-up): 3
2009–10, 2012–13, 2021-22
 Al Kurafi Cup: 3 (record) (defunct)
 1998–99, 2000–01, 2001–02
 (runner-up): 2
 2003–04, 2005–06

International
 GCC Champions League: 2
 1982*, 2003
(* First ever winners)
 (runner-up): 3
1983, 1985, 1994
 Arab Champions League/ UAFA Cup/ Arab Club Championship: 0
 (runner-up): 1
2012–13

Friendly
Not counted with the other 63 Official Championships
 Kuwait unofficial league: 1
1956–57
 (runner-up): 2
1954–55, 1955–56
 Shot Cup: 1
 1978–79
 Binjab FC Cup: 1
 1970–71
 Perak friendly Cup: 1
 1970–71
 Qasion Cup: 1
 1966–67
 Farul Romania Friendly: 1
 1968–69
 Eintracht e.V Cup special: 1
1981–82

International Award
Khaleeji sport KUW:
Best fans of the year(1): 2014

Kems Awards:
Fans of the season(1): 2014–15

Performance in UAFA and AFC competitions

UAFA
 GCC Champions League: 7
 1982: Champions
 1998: Round of 16
 2003: Champions
 2007: Group stage
 2011: Semi-final
 2012: Semi-final
 2015–16: Tournament postponed
 Arab Champions League /UAFA Cup: 3
 2007–08: Round of 16
 2008–09: Withdrew 
 2012–13: Runners-up

AFC
 AFC Champions League: 6
 1994: 1st round
 1998: 1st round
 2003: 4th round
 2004: Group stage
 2006: Group stage
 2007: Group stage
 AFC Cup: 1
 2008–09: Quarter-final

Friendlies
 Bani Yas International Tournament: 1
 2013–14: 3rd place

Asian record
 Asian Club Championship

 AFC Champions League

 AFC Cup

Futsal

Achievements
 Kuwaiti Futsal League: 0

 (runners-up): 1
2012–13
 Kuwaiti Futsal Federation Cup: 1
2012–13
 (runners-up): 2
2014–15, 2015–16
 Kuwaiti Futsal Super Cup: 0
 (runners-up): 1
2013–14

Sponsorship

In the Al-Arabi SC signed a 4-year deal with Adidas and then signed with ANTA Sports in the 2013–14 season Due to Adidas not willing to renew their contract after that in 2014–15 season Macron  bought ANTA Sports contract and made a contract with Al-Arabi SC. Extended Contract with Macron, while after negotiations with the brand ended the club signed with Erreà.

Notes:
1:* Sponsor on arm side of Kit

Sponsors

  Ooreedoo (Wantaniya's new name) (2008–)
  Al-Ahli Bank of Kuwait (2007–)
  Bati Goal (2009–10)
  Farooj Restaurant Co.
  Ameer Al-Omara'a
  Shahid Newspaper
  BKME
  ViTO
  Al-Tijaree (2008 Special Classic match)
  Health House Nutrition (2014–)
  Herfy restaurant
  Adidas (2009–13)
  Hummel International (handball team only)
  NIKE (2003–09)
  Aramex (on international tournaments)
   Chili's Restaurant (2013–)
  Turkish Airways
  ANTA Sports (2013–14)
  Macron (2014–)

References

External links

 arabiclub.net (Official fanwebsite) 

 
Arabi
Arabi
Arabi
Arabi
Arabi
Arabi